BHRA may refer to:
Brooklyn Historic Railway Association
 British Hydromechanics Research Association, later known as BHR Fluid Engineering
British Hot Rod Association
British Hotels and Restaurants Association